Persatuan Sepakbola Martapura or Persemar is an Indonesian football team based in Martapura, South Kalimantan. They currently competes in Liga 3.

Honours
 Liga 3 South Kalimantan
 Champion: 2021

References

External links
 

Football clubs in Indonesia
Football clubs in South Kalimantan
Sport in South Kalimantan